Analyzing Marx: Morality, Power and History is a 1984 book about the philosopher Karl Marx by the political philosopher Richard W. Miller.

Reception
The sociologist Erik Olin Wright, Andrew Levine, and the philosopher Elliott Sober described Analyzing Marx as a representative work of Analytical Marxism. The philosopher Jan Narveson wrote that the book is, "an example of the lengths to which a sympathizer must go in attempting to retrieve a theory."

See also
 Karl Marx: His Life and Environment

References

Bibliography
Books

 
 
 

1984 non-fiction books
Contemporary philosophical literature
English-language books
Political philosophy literature
Books about Marxism
Books by Richard W. Miller